HMS Boyne was a 98-gun Royal Navy second-rate ship of the line launched on 27 July 1790 at Woolwich. She was the flagship of Vice Admiral John Jervis in 1794. She caught fire and blew up in 1795.

Invasion of Guadeloupe
In 1793, Boyne set sail on 24 November for the West Indies, carrying Lieutenant-general Sir Charles Grey and Vice-admiral Sir John Jervis for an invasion of Guadeloupe. On the way, Yellow fever ravaged the crew. Still, the British managed to get the French to surrender at Fort St. Charles in Guadeloupe on 21 April of the following year. The capture of Fort St. Charles, the batteries, and the town of Basse-Terre cost the British army two men killed, four wounded, and five missing; the navy had no casualties.

Fate

Boyne caught fire and blew up on 1 May 1795 at Spithead.  She was lying at anchor while the Royal Marines of the vessel were practising firing exercises. It is supposed that the funnel of the wardroom stove, which passed through the decks, set fire to papers in the Admiral's cabin. The fire was only discovered when flames burst through the poop, by which time it was too late to do anything. The fire spread rapidly and she was aflame from one end to the other within half an hour.

As soon as the fleet noticed the fire, other vessels sent boats to render assistance. As a result, the death toll on Boyne was only eleven men. At the same time, the signal was made for the vessels most at danger from the fire to get under way. Although the tide and wind were not favourable, all the vessels in any danger were able to escape to St Helens.

Because the guns were always left loaded, the cannons began to 'cook off', firing shots at potential rescuers making their way to the ship, resulting in the deaths of two seamen and the injury of another aboard , anchored nearby. Later in the day, the fire burnt the cables and Boyne drifted eastward till she grounded on the east end of the Spit, opposite Southsea Castle. There she blew up soon after.

Post-script
The wreck presented something of a hazard to a navigation and as a result it was blown up on 30 August 1838 in a clearance attempt, and yet again a final attempt on 24 June 1840.

Today the Boyne buoy marks the site of the explosion. A few metal artefacts from the ship remain atop a mound of shingle.

Citations

References

 
Lavery, Brian (2003) The Ship of the Line - Volume 1: The development of the battlefleet 1650-1850. Conway Maritime Press. .

External links 
 

Boyne-class ships of the line (1790)
Ship fires
Maritime incidents in 1795
1790 ships
Ships sunk by non-combat internal explosions